Australia and Brunei established diplomatic relations in 1984. Australia has a high commission in Bandar Seri Begawan, and Brunei has a high commission in Canberra.

History 
Relations between the two of the countries can be traced back during World War II when the Australian Army played a crucial role to liberating Brunei from Japanese occupation in 1945. While the present relations between the two countries were established since 1984 when Australia became one of the first countries to establish diplomatic relations with Brunei. Both countries had enjoyed a warm relationship before 1959 when Brunei achieved self-government. Now, the relations were mainly focused to defence and security, education, as well as on trade.

Economic relations 

From 2012 to 2013, Brunei was ranked as Australia's 39th largest trading partner with the total bilateral trade between the two countries reached U$1.026 billion. Brunei crude petroleum comprising U$978 million of the total trade. There is also a number of Australian teachers and other professionals work in Brunei while Australia became one of the destination for Bruneian students.

Security relations 
Both countries enjoys a defence relations particularly in military exercises and trainings.

References 

 
Brunei
Bilateral relations of Brunei